Eureka is a rural locality in the Bundaberg Region, Queensland, Australia.

History 
In 1887,  of land were resumed from the Eureka (Toomolongyore) pastoral run. The land was offered for selection for the establishment of small farms on 17 April 1887.

Education 
There are no schools in Eureka. The nearest primary schools are in Childers, Booyal, Cordalba and Dallarnil. The nearest secondary schools is in Childers (Isis District State High School).

References

External links 

 

Bundaberg Region
Localities in Queensland